Mahog, is a tiny village in Chail tehsil of Solan district of Himachal Pradesh India. It has its population only in two digits (50).It is at a distance of around five kilometer from Chail on Kandaghat road.This village is famous for floriculture.There are many hitech floriculture polyhouse farms in the village.Flowers and the scenic view around the village has a great attraction for the tourists.As a result, many cottages and hotels are coming up in and around this village.

Gallery

References

Cities and towns in Solan district